Lioptilodes arequipa is a species of moth in the genus Lioptilodes known from Peru and Chile. Moths of this species take flight in January and April and have a wingspan of approximately 21 millimetres. The specific name "arequipa" refers to the Arequipa Region, where the Peruvian specimen was collected.

References

Platyptiliini
Moths described in 2006